Dher Chalaki Jinkara is Bhojpuri film released in 1971 directed by Datta Keshav.

See also 
 Bhojpuri Film Industry
 List of Bhojpuri films

References

External links

1971 films
1970s Bhojpuri-language films